Castle Book I is a 1978 fantasy role-playing game supplement published by Judges Guild.

Contents
Castle Book I presents fifty castles of varying shapes and sizes.

Publication history
Judges Guild began their publication of original material with a subscription format, but by 1978 the line between subscription and non-subscriptions items would grow increasingly vague. However their Castle Book I (1978), which had 50 castle maps, could not be found among the subscription packets at all. From there on, the subscription installments represented only some of the Judges Guild books for those months. A listing of cumulative sales from 1981 shows that Castle Book I sold over 15,000 units.

Different Worlds Publications later acquired and distributed game products formerly produced by Judges Guild, including Village Book 1, Village Book 2, Castle Book I, and Castle Book II.

Reception
In the May 1981 edition of The Space Gamer (No. 39), Kurt Butterfield  commented that "The Castle Book has many interesting ideas in it. For the price, it's a bargain."

Patrick Amory reviewed Castles Book I for Different Worlds magazine and stated that "Some are a little outlandish, but who cares? This is fantasy! Again, its usefulness lies in the fact that the GM will almost certainly not have all the castles in his campaign mapped out in this detail."

In the May 1988 edition of Dragon (Issue #133), Ken Rolston said, "There are no details for the functions or contents of the individual buildings, but it’s nice to have the layouts when whipping up an adventure setting on short notice."

References

Judges Guild fantasy role-playing game supplements
Role-playing game supplements introduced in 1978